Paralophia is a monotypic beetle genus in the family Cerambycidae described by Per Olof Christopher Aurivillius in 1924. Its single species, Paralophia quadrinodosa, was described by the same author in the same year.

References

Pteropliini
Beetles described in 1924